The 1946–47 Chicago American Gears season was the Gears' third year in the United States' National Basketball League (NBL), which was also the tenth year the league existed. Twelve teams competed in the NBL in 1946–47, comprising six teams in both the Eastern and Western Divisions.

Chicago played their home games at International Amphitheatre. Despite finishing tied for third place in the Western Division, the American Gears made a surprise playoffs run by winning the first series three games to two (3–2) over the Indianapolis Kautskys, followed by a 2–0 sweep of Oshkosh All-Stars in the semifinals. They then went on to win their first league championship 3–1 over Eastern Division champion Rochester Royals.

Player-coach Bobby McDermott (First Team), George Mikan (First), and Bob Calihan (Second) earned All-NBL honors .

Roster

Note: Bob Cotton, Bill McDonald, Irv Noren, Les Rothman, and Bob Synnott were not on the playoffs roster.

Regular season

Season standings

Playoffs

Opening Round
(2W) Indianapolis Kautskys vs. (3W) Chicago American Gears: Chicago wins series 3–2
Game 1 @ Indianapolis: Chicago 74, Indianapolis 72
Game 2 @ Indianapolis: Chicago 69, Indianapolis 61
Game 3 @ Chicago: Indianapolis 68, Chicago 67
Game 4 @ Chicago: Indianapolis 55, Chicago 54
Game 5 @ Chicago: Chicago 76, Indianapolis 62

Semifinals
(1W) Oshkosh All-Stars vs. (3W) Chicago American Gears: Chicago wins series 2–0
Game 1 @ Chicago: Chicago 60, Oshkosh 54
Game 2 @ Oshkosh: Chicago 61, Oshkosh 60

NBL Championship
(1E) Rochester Royals vs. (3W) Chicago American Gears: Chicago wins series 3–1
Game 1 @ Rochester: Rochester 71, Chicago 65
Game 2 @ Rochester: Chicago 67, Rochester 63
Game 3 @ Chicago: Chicago 78, Rochester 70
Game 4 @ Chicago: Chicago 79, Rochester 68

Awards and honors
 First Team All-NBL – Bobby McDermott and George Mikan
 Second Team All-NBL – Bob Calihan

References

Chicago American Gears seasons
Chicago
National Basketball League (United States) championship seasons
Chicago American Gears
Chicago American Gears